William Layton may refer to:

William Layton (actor), American playwright and actor
William Layton (by 1514-51/52), MP for Lichfield
William Layton (MP for Newcastle-under-Lyme), MP for Newcastle-under-Lyme (UK Parliament constituency)
Bill Layton, English footballer
Billy Layton, English footballer

See also
William Leighton (disambiguation)